Jorge Caetano Rubens (born 19 June 1941) is a Brazilian former footballer who competed in the 1960 Summer Olympics.

References

1941 births
Living people
Association football midfielders
Brazilian footballers
Olympic footballers of Brazil
Footballers at the 1960 Summer Olympics
Fluminense FC players
São Paulo FC players
Sociedade Esportiva Palmeiras players
Pan American Games medalists in football
Pan American Games silver medalists for Brazil
Footballers at the 1959 Pan American Games
Medalists at the 1959 Pan American Games